Odaraia is a genus of bivalved arthropod from the Middle Cambrian. Its fossils, which reach  in length, have been found in the Burgess Shale in British Columbia, Canada.

Odaraia bore a large pair of eyes at the front of its body, and may have had two smaller eyes in between. It had a tubular body with at least 45 pairs of biramous limbs, and its tail had three fins – two horizontal, one vertical – which were used to stabilise the animal as it swam on its back. It has been suggested to have been an actively swimming filter feeder or predator, using its limbs to capture or sift food items from the water column, before using its appendages to transfer food to its mouth.

217 specimens of Odaraia alata are known from the Greater Phyllopod Bed, where they comprise 0.41% of the community.

It is currently classified as a member of Hymenocarina, a group containing many bivalved arthropods.

Further reading

References

External links

Odaraia in the Paleobiology Database

Burgess Shale fossils
Cambrian arthropods of North America
Maotianshan shales fossils
Fossil taxa described in 1912
Hymenocarina
Cambrian genus extinctions